Fordham Leadership Academy (FLA), mostly called  Fordham Leadership, is a small school located within Roosevelt Educational Campus, across the street from Fordham University.

References

External links
 Fordham Leadership Academy (DOE website)
 Listing on insideschools.org

Public high schools in the Bronx
Belmont, Bronx